= Rough Island Story =

1939 British educational television series

Rough Island Story is a British television series which aired on the BBC during 1939. Consisting of six 25-minute episodes, the series provided an outline of British history using maps, pictures and film, and featured Harold Nicolson and J. F. Horrabin.

None of the episodes still exist, as it aired live, and methods to record live television did not exist until late 1947, and were used very rarely by the BBC until around 1953.

== Episode list ==
- Before 1066 (15 May 1939)
- Towns and Trades (7 June 1939)
- Opening the Atlantic (19 June 1939)
- The Lure of the Indies (28 June 1939)
- The New World (19 July 1939)
- Steel and Steam (26 July 1939)
